Mount Brocklehurst is a dome-shaped mountain, with peak at , standing north of Mawson Glacier and  west of Mount Murray in Victoria Land. It was first charted by the British Antarctic Expedition, 1907–09, which named it for Sir Philip Lee Brocklehurst, who contributed to the expedition and was assistant geologist on it.

References 

Mountains of Victoria Land
Scott Coast